The drug combination morphine/naltrexone (trade name Embeda) is an opioid combination pain medication developed by King Pharmaceuticals for use in moderate to severe pain. The active ingredients are morphine sulfate and naltrexone hydrochloride; morphine being an opioid receptor agonist and naltrexone an opioid receptor antagonist. It is a schedule 2 controlled substance, and is intended for long-term pain caused by malignancy or where lower tiers of the pain management ladder have already been exhausted, and where medications such as oxycodone would otherwise have been indicated.

King Pharmaceuticals temporarily recalled Embeda in 2011 after complaints from the FDA in regard to King Pharmaceuticals omitting information regarding the potentially fatal reaction if crushed and swallowed and also for making unsubstantiated claims regarding Embeda's reduced abuse potential.

Embeda became available again some years later.

See also
Hydrocodone/paracetamol
Hydrocodone/ibuprofen
Oxycodone/paracetamol
Oxycodone/aspirin
Oxycodone/naloxone
Fentanyl/fluanisone

References

Opiates
Semisynthetic opioids
Kappa-opioid receptor antagonists
Mu-opioid receptor antagonists
Pfizer brands
Combination analgesics